Slacker, whose real name was Shem McCauley, was a British electronic music house, hip hop and R&B producer.  He owned Jukebox in the Sky record label.  He was also known under the names "Head Honcho", "Ramp" "Live It!" and "DJ Streets Ahead".  Slacker, who was based in England, had released records on many labels including XL Recordings, Loaded Records, and Perfecto Records.

Shem McCauley died in Bangkok, Thailand, in January 2012.

Discography

Album
 Start a New Life (2010)

Singles

Remixes
 Was (Not Was) - "Spy in the House of Love (Streetsahead mix)" (1987)
 Blur - "Entertain Me (The Live It! Remix)" (1995)
 The Prodigy – "Smack My Bitch Up" (1998)
 Golden Girls – "Kinetic" (1998)
 Junkie XL – Zerotonine" (1999)
 Bedrock – "Voices" (2000)
 Dave Kane – "Clarkness" (2001)

Notable collaborators
Norman Cook (aka Fatboy Slim)
Carl Cox, DJ
Tim Westwood, BBC Radio 1 DJ, England.
The Prodigy

References

External links
MySpace
Discogs entry
Interview with Progressive-Sounds
WorldDJ entry

Year of birth missing
2012 deaths
British record producers
Hip hop record producers